SSAO may refer to:

Screen space ambient occlusion, an implementation of an ambient occlusion illumination in computer graphics
Semicarbazide-sensitive amine oxidase, an enzyme